Blyth may refer to:

People
 Blyth (surname)
 Blythe (given name)

Places

Australia
 Blyth, South Australia, a small town

Canada
 Blyth, Ontario, a village

United Kingdom
 Blyth, Northumberland, a town
 Blyth Valley (UK Parliament constituency)
 Blyth, Nottinghamshire, a village
 River Blyth, Northumberland
 River Blyth, Suffolk

Other uses 
 Baron Blyth, title in the UK peerage
 Blyth, Inc., a personal goods manufacturing and distribution company
 The Blyth Academy, Blyth, Northumberland, England
 Blyth Education, a Canadian company that runs a chain of private secondary schools

See also 
 
 Blithe (disambiguation)
 Blythe (disambiguation)
 River Blyth (disambiguation)